Ratare  is a village in the municipality of Paraćin, Serbia. According to the 2011 census, the village has a population of 544 people.

Architecture
The architecture of Ratare is fairly generic. Composed of houses and a few stores. A bit more major building is a church.

References

Populated places in Pomoravlje District